The Suit and the Photograph is a 1998 album by Michael Nyman with the Michael Nyman Band, recorded in 1995. On this album, Nyman is the composer, conductor, and producer, and wrote the liner notes. The album contains two works, String Quartet No. 4 and 3 Quartets. The album is named for its cover photograph by August Sander, which Nyman had associated with the Michael Nyman Band since its inception in 1977. He cites a description of the photograph by John Berger, in an essay of the same title, describing that the suits deform the working class rural men just enough to "undermine physical dignity." Both of the pieces on the album originated in Japan.  It is Nyman's second release on EMI and his 33rd in general, but is not designated part of a series, as EMI had done with Concertos.  Said Nyman of EMI, "I didn't excite them, and they didn't excite me."  Nyman's only further releases on EMI would be the UK edition of Ravenous, featuring remixes by William Orbit, and The Actors, both film scores.

String Quartet No. 4
The String Quartet No. 4 is based on Yamamoto Perpetuo, a solo violin work, and the basis of Strong on Oaks, Strong on the Causes of Oaks.  The piece was written in 1994-5 for Camilli Quartet (headed by former Michael Nyman Band member Elisabeth Perry), who first performed it on April 21, 1995, and ultimately dedicated to the memory of Alan Bush, Nyman's composition teacher at the Royal Academy of Music after his death October 31 of that year.  The main theme of the sixth movement became the basis for "Virgin on the Roof" in Nyman's score for Carrington, which in turn was based on the String Quartet No. 3 with which Christopher Hampton had created a temp track.

Pwyll ap Siôn notes that the viola and second violin follow a different meter from that of the first violin.  Essentially, Yamamoto Perpetuo was the basis only of the first violin's part in the Quartet, while the newly composed material goes in completely new directions, even to not matching meter.

3 Quartets
3 Quartets was commissioned by  the Arion-Edo Foundation of Japan.  John Harle and Elisabeth Perry joined a group of Japanese musicians at the Globe Theatre, Tokyo for its first performance July 15, 1994, conducted by Michael Nyman.

It is a multi-section, multi-tempoed single-movement work for a string quartet, saxophone quartet, and brass quartet.  This piece also worked its way into the Carrington film score—the opening fanfare became a leitmotif for Mark Gertler.  The heart of the work is a soprano saxophone chorale, and the work closes with a brass chorale.

On the album, the Camilli Quartet joins the Michael Nyman Band for performance of the piece.

Track listing
I 3:36
II 3:17
III 2:28
IV 6:19
V 3:03
VI 4:04
VII 4:07
VIII 2:24
IX 3:39
X 2:47
XI 3:10
XII 3:00
3 Quartets 14:24

Personnel
Camilli Quartet
Elisabeth Perry, violin
Rachel Browne, violin
Prunella Pacey, viola
Melissa Phelps, cello

Michael Nyman Band
Elisabeth Perry, violin
Rachel Browne, violin
Prunella Pacey, viola
Melissa Phelps, cello
John Harle, soprano saxophone
David Roach, soprano and alto saxophones
Simon Haram, tenor saxophone
Andrew Findon, baritone saxophone
Nigel Gomm, trumpets 1 and 2
David Lee, horn
Andrew Fawbert, bass trombone
conducted by Michael Nyman
Producers: Michael Nyman & Michael J. Dutton
Balance engineer: Michael J. Dutton
Front cover: August Sander, Bauernkapelle, Westerwald, c. 1913 (c) Die Photographische Sammlung/SK Stiftung Kultur - August Sander Archiv, Köln; DACS, London, 1998
Publisher: Chester Music Ltd/Michael Nyman Ltd
Michael Nyman management by Susan Read
Special thanks to Michael J. Dutton, Nigel Barr, Liz Perry, John Berger

References

1998 albums
Michael Nyman albums